The 2017 Riyadh summit was a series of three summits held on 20–21 May 2017 on the occasion of the visit of United States President Donald Trump to Saudi Arabia, his first trip overseas. The summit included one bilateral meeting, between the United States and Saudi Arabia, and two multilateral meetings, one between the members of the Gulf Cooperation Council and the other with Arab and Muslim countries. Leaders and representatives of 54 Arab and Muslim countries, all members of the Organisation of Islamic Cooperation, and the United States took part. Iran and Turkey boycotted the summit, and Syria was not invited.

United States–Saudi Arabia summit

President Trump made his first foreign trip to Saudi Arabia arriving at King Khalid International Airport on May 20, where he met with King Salman. Trump then traveled to the Murabba Palace, where the King awarded him the Collar of Abdulaziz Al Saud. Trump later visited the National Museum of Saudi Arabia. In the evening, Trump and the U.S. delegation took part in the traditional ardah sword dance.

Trade agreement and arms deal

On May 20, 2017, U.S. President Donald Trump signed a US$350 billion arms deal with the Kingdom of Saudi Arabia. The arms deal was the largest in world history. The transaction included tanks, combat ships missile defence systems, as well as radar, communications and cybersecurity technology. The transfer was widely seen as a counterbalance against the influence of Iran in the region. The arms transfer was described by news outlets as a "significant" and "historic" expansion of United States relations with Saudi Arabia.

United States – Gulf Cooperation Council Summit
Trump met with GCC leaders the morning of May 21.

Arab Islamic American Summit

King Salman and President Trump gave keynote addresses at the Arab Islamic American Summit. Trump called for Muslim leaders to "drive out" terrorism from their countries, and condemned Hamas and the Iranian government for their support of the government of Bashar al-Assad. Also speaking were President Abdel Fattah el-Sisi of Egypt, Emir Sabah Al-Ahmad Al-Jaber Al-Sabah of Kuwait, King Abdullah II of Jordan, President Joko Widodo of Indonesia, and Prime Minister Najib Razak of Malaysia.

At the close of the summit the leaders inaugurated the new Global Center for Combating Extremism in Riyadh, intended as a centre of excellence for fighting violent extremism which is conducive to terrorism, involving a number of international counter-extremism experts. To officially open the center King Salman, President Trump, and President el-Sisi placed their hands on a glowing orb in the shape of a globe, which was cause for mirth among the international media.

Countries attending

: President Ashraf Ghani
: Albanian Ambassador to Saudi Arabia Sami Shiba
: President of the Council of the Nation Abdelkader Bensalah,
: President Ilham Aliyev
: King Hamad bin Isa Al Khalifa
: Prime Minister Sheikh Hasina
: President Patrice Talon
: Sultan Hassanal Bolkiah
: President Roch Marc Kabore
: Minister of Foreign Affairs Lejeune Mbella Mbella
: President Idriss Déby
: President Azali Assoumani
: President Ismaïl Omar Guelleh
: President Abdel Fattah el-Sisi
: President Ali Bongo Ondimba
: President Adama Barrow
: President Alpha Condé
: President José Mário Vaz
: President David A. Granger
: President Joko Widodo
: President Fuad Masum
: President Alassane Ouattara
: King Abdullah II
: President Nursultan Nazarbayev
: Emir Sabah Al-Ahmad Al-Jaber Al-Sabah
: First Deputy Prime Minister Mukhammedkalyi Abylgaziev
: Prime Minister Saad Hariri
: Prime Minister Fayez al-Sarraj
: Prime Minister Najib Razak
: President Abdulla Yameen
: President Ibrahim Boubacar Keïta
: President Mohamed Ould Abdel Aziz
: Minister of Foreign Affairs Nasser Bourita
: Minister of Foreign Affairs José Condungua Pacheco
: President Mahamadou Issoufou
: Minister of Defence Mansur Dan Ali
: Deputy Prime Minister Fahd bin Mahmoud al Said
: Prime Minister Nawaz Sharif
: Emir Tamim Bin Hamad Al Thani
: President Mahmoud Abbas
: President Macky Sall
: President Ernest Bai Koroma
: President Mohamed Abdullahi Mohamed 
: Minister of State Taha al-Hussein
: Minister of Foreign Affairs Yldiz Pollack-Beighle
: President Emomali Rahmon
: President Faure Gnassingbé
: President Beji Caid Essebsi
: Minister of Foreign Affairs Mevlut Cavusoglu
: Minister of Foreign Affairs Raşit Meredow
: State Minister of Foreign Affairs for International Affairs Henry Oryem Okello
: President Shavkat Mirziyoyev
: President Abdrabbuh Mansour Hadi 
: Crown Prince of Abu Dhabi Mohammed bin Zayed Al Nahyan
:  President Donald Trump

Cancelled

: King Mohammed VI was scheduled to attend but cancelled his plans a week prior to the summit for unspecified reasons.
: President Omar al-Bashir declined to attend after officials at the U.S. Embassy in Riyadh registered their objections to his planned attendance. President al-Bashir is wanted by the International Criminal Court for genocide and war crimes.

Aftermath

Emboldened by Trump's criticism of Iran, many Arab countries decided to take action against their perceived enemies. Bahrain began cracking down on its Shi'ite majority, killing 5 and arresting 286 people. Bahrain also shut down an independent newspaper and outlawed country's last opposition group.

On 5 June 2017, Saudi Arabia, UAE, Yemen, Egypt and Bahrain all announced they were cutting diplomatic ties with Qatar. Hamid Aboutalebi, deputy chief of staff of Iran's President Hassan Rouhani, tweeted, "What is happening is the preliminary result of the sword dance," referring to Trump's conduct at the Summit.

Popular culture
An image of King Salman, U.S. President Trump, and Egyptian President el-Sisi touching an illuminated globe (see above) sparked a brief commotion on the Internet, particularly the social media website Twitter. Users dubbed the globe "the Orb" and made reference to various popular culture objects, such as the Palantír from J. R. R. Tolkien's The Lord of the Rings series and "The Orb of Peace" from Star Wars: Episode I – The Phantom Menace. The Atlantic's James Parker later wrote that "Every presidency has iconic photographs. But there’s nothing else like this one."

Noticing that Americans wanted to have their picture taken with the orb, the Saudi government gave it to the US embassy as a gift. The orb was initially put on display there, but ultimately put into storage.

See also
 Islamic Military Counter Terrorism Coalition
 2017 United States–Saudi Arabia arms deal
 Impeachment inquiry against Donald Trump

References

External links

Diplomatic conferences in Saudi Arabia
Presidency of Donald Trump
Riyadh summit
Riyadh summit
Riyadh summit
Riyadh summit
Riyadh summit
21st-century diplomatic conferences
21st century in Riyadh
United States presidential visits
Saudi Arabia–United States relations